Aspen Summer Words (ASW) is a festival of words, stories and ideas held each June in Aspen, Colorado. It is the flagship program of Aspen Words, a literary arts non-profit and program of the Aspen Institute. Until 2015, Aspen Words was known as the Aspen Writers' Foundation.

History
For 40 years, Aspen Summer Words has hosted over 300 writers who have read, taught and performed for 20,000+ audience members and students.  ASW literati have included an international cast of authors — Nobel Laureates, Pulitzer Prize winners, National Book Awardees, and many other notable and bestselling writers — who each year transform Aspen into the Rocky Mountain gateway to the literary world.

Established in 1976, Aspen Summer Words (ASW) is a festival of words, stories and ideas held each June in Aspen, Colorado. The six-day event celebrates authors in all their guises (novelists, poets, memoirists, journalists, songwriters, filmmakers, comedians, editors, literary agents, and more) during a jam-packed schedule of events designed to spark the imaginations of readers and writers alike.

The flagship program of the Aspen Words, ASW has been hailed as one of the nation's "Top Ten Literary Gatherings" (USA Today) and included in "The Best of Aspen" (5280 Magazine).  O: The Oprah Magazine said, "Bringing new meaning to the idea of escaping into literature, Aspen Summer Words [takes] over the Colorado town, giving booklovers the chance to mingle with some of the biggest names in storytelling."

Overview
ASW is one part laboratory and one part theater. Its two programs — the Writing Retreat and Literary Festival — approach the written word from different, yet complementary angles. The Retreat is designed for writing students, featuring introductory and intensive workshops with some of the nation's most notable faculty members; a literature appreciation course; and professional consultations with literary agents and editors. The Writing Retreat supports writers in developing their craft by providing a winning combination of inspiration, skills, community, and opportunity.

Each year workshops are held in a variety of genres including fiction, memoir, novel editing, and poetry.

Writing retreat
There are two types of writing workshops:

The five-day juried workshops are for students seeking intensive instruction and individualized critique to polish a manuscript they have in development. Daily writing exercises, reading assignments and discussion of student work are the basis for the classes. A manuscript submission is required for admission. Writing classes are limited to 12 students.
The five-day non-juried workshops include workshops for writers of all levels who wish to get their feet wet in the world of writing.

Literary festival/Public events
The literary festival consists of readings and conversations with the award-winning faculty and publishing experts of Aspen Summer Words. These events are open to workshop participants as well as to the general public. Topics include the craft of writing, the writing life, the business of writing, and many others. Between 2005 and 2013, each edition of the Literary Festival showcased the literary heritage of a new culture by using the stories and storytellers of a particular region, including The West, The American South, Ireland, India, Africa, and the Middle East, Latin America and the Caribbean.

Consultations
Consultations are private meetings with guest editors and agents that offer the chance to pitch an idea, receive feedback on a manuscript and network with professionals from the top publishing houses and literary agencies in the country, including Simon & Schuster, Henry Holt & Co., Tin House, Carnicelli Literary Management, Penguin Random House, and other prestigious literary organizations.

Aspen Prize For Literature
The Aspen Prize for Literature ceremony was a part of the Aspen Summer Words week until 2013.  The annual Prize was presented by the Aspen Writers' Foundation to recognize outstanding achievement in literature and was established to encourage cultural, political, economic, spiritual, and intellectual change toward a world of great human kindness.  Past recipients include Wole Soyinka, Ngugi wa Thiong'o, N. Scott Momaday, Paul Muldoon, Edna O'Brien, Salman Rushdie, Ron Carlson, Ernest Gaines, Colum McCann, Edwidge Danticat, and Luis Urrea.

Past authors

   2015
Dani Shapiro
Andre Dubus III
Richard Russo
Akhil Sharma
Hannah Tinti
Liz Van Hoose
James Bohnen

   2014
Billy Collins
Meg Wolitzer
Meghan Daum
Bernard Cooper
Mary Beth Keane
Melissa Bank
Julia Glass
Andre Dubus III

   2012
Erin Belieu
Darrell Bourque
Laura Fraser
Francisco Goldman
Derek Green
Scott Lasser
Andrew Sean Greer
Randall Kenan
William Loizeaux
Benjamin Percy
Mona Simpson
Luis Alberto Urrea 
Daniel Alarcón
Gioconda Belli
Edwidge Danticat
Orlando Patterson

   2011 
Mona Eltahawy
Nikky Finney
Derek Green
Erica Jong
Randall Kenan
Elinor Lipman
Colum McCann
Ron Rash
Rabin Alameddine
Reza Aslan
Peter Cole
Firoozeh Dumas
Assaf Gavron
Khaled Hosseini
Daniyal Mueenuddin

   2010
Edward Carey 
Richard Bausch 
Dana Gioia
Randall Kenan 
Scott Lasser
William Loizeaux
Elizabeth McCracken
Dorothy Allison
Nikky Finney
Ernest Gaines
Ron Rash
Kathryn Stockett

   2009
Ron Carlson 
Pamela Painter 
Bill Loizeaux 
Chris Merrill 
Hallie Ephron 
Nic Pizzolatto 
Gary Ferguson 
Allison Berkley
David Davidar
Dana Gioia

   2008
Ishmael Beah
Colum McCann
David Davidar
Dana Gioia
Sue Miller 
Richard Buasch 
Pamela Painter 
Bill Loizeaux 
Robert Pinsky 
Nic Pizzolatto 
Doug Bauer 
Jan Greenburg 
Chimamanda Adichie

   2007
Robert Bausch 
Pam Houston 
Percival Everett 
Gary Ferguson 
Dorianne Laux 
Terry Curtis Fox 
Danzy Senna 
Bharti Kirchner
 
   2006
Amy Bloom 
Ron Carlson 
Pam Houston 
Ted Conover 
Christopher Merrill 
Laura Fraser 

   2005
John Romano 
Gary Ferguson 
David Leite 
Robert Bausch 
Robert Boswell 
Elinor Lipman 
Joyce Maynard 
Marie Ponsot 

   2004
Jan Greenburg 
Fentor Johnson 
Madeline Blais 
Ron Carlson 
Jane Hirsfield 
Elinor Lipman 

   2003
Amy Bloom
Ron Carlson
James Houston 
Pam Houston
Christopher Merrill
David Peterson

   2002
Ted Conover
Gretel Ehrlich
Pam Houston
Chip Kidd
Scott Lasser
Mary Jo Salter
Mark Salzman
Larry Watson

   2001
Madeleine Blais
Peter Fromm
Pam Houston
Ted Conover
Ursula Hegi
Mark Salzman

   2000
Judith Barnard 
Chris Merrill
Fenton
Kent Haruf
Pam Houston
Rachel Jacobsohn
Betsy Lerner 
Lois Lowry 
Skip Press 
Alex Amin

See also
Literary festival

References

1976 establishments in Colorado
Aspen, Colorado
Festivals established in 1976
Literary festivals in the United States